Kanach Tala or Goytala is a village that is, de facto, in the Shushi Province of the breakaway Republic of Artsakh; de jure, it is in the Shusha District of Azerbaijan, in the disputed region of Nagorno-Karabakh. The village had an Azerbaijani-majority population before they fled the fighting of the First Nagorno-Karabakh War.

History 
During the Soviet period, the village was part of the Shusha District of the Nagorno-Karabakh Autonomous Oblast.

Historical heritage sites 
Historical heritage sites in and around the village include tombs from the 2nd–1st millennia BCE, a 12th/13th-century village, and a 19th-century cemetery.

Economy and culture 
The population is mainly engaged in agriculture and animal husbandry. The village is a part of the community of Yeghtsahogh.

Demographics 
The village had 9 inhabitants in 2005, and 16 inhabitants in 2015.

References

External links 

 

Populated places in Shushi Province
Populated places in Shusha District